Baydar may refer to:

People with the surname
 Alaattin Baydar (1901–1990), Turkish football player
 Mehmet Baydar (1924–1973), Turkish assassinated diplomat
 Metin Lütfi Baydar, Turkish medical scientist
 Oya Baydar, Turkish writer

Places
 Baydar, (Bayramlı, Shamkir)
 Baydar Gate
 Baydar Valley

Turkish-language surnames